Kharchi are the Gods of the Tripuri people.

See also
Tripura
Tripuri culture

References

 Tripura - A profile by Guha, NBT, New Delhi
 Glory of Tripura Civilisation, Parul Prakashani, 2006

South Asian deities
Religion in Tripura
Tripuri culture